Paul Douglas Jennings (born 20 February 1970) is a British racing cyclist who won a silver medal at the 1994 Commonwealth Games and a number of national titles. He competed in track and road cycling.

Early life 
Jennings started cycling at the age of 14 in Preston England riding for Preston Wheelers then later Ribble Valley Cycling Club.

Professional racing career 
After finishing second in the 1990 National Junior Road Race Jennings attended the Junior Road World Championships in 1990. In 1991 Jennings won two national titles and was selected to compete for Great Britain at the Junior World Championships in the team pursuit, team time trial and individual pursuit events. In 1992, at the age of 19, Jennings was selected to the British Olympic Team and competed in the Team Pursuit Team that came 5th setting a new British record 1992 Olympic Games.

In 1993 he joined the Kodak Racing Team and trained with Chris Boardman for the world hour record and competed in the 100km Team Time Trail and 50km Points Race for Great Britain at the World Championships in Norway. Jennings won seven national championships during his senior racing career and medaled in both road and track disciplines.

In the early 90s he was recorded at over 100 km/h on a descent during the Isle of Man International Cycling Week, while hung over, before going on to win the race in a bunch sprint (1 lap of the TT circuit).

In the 1994 Commonwealth Games he raced for the English road racing team and won a silver medal in the 100 km team time trial setting a new British record of 1hr 56m.

During his career Jennings won a total of nine National Championships and represented Great Britain on numerous occasions.

Retirement 
Jennings was injured in an automobile accident in 1996, causing him to retire from professional cycle racing.

Jennings then took up BMX, dirt jumping, mountain biking, and skateboarding. He participated in the Coppermine Classic mountain bike race near Nelson, New Zealand, in February 2013, where he placed 5th overall and 1st in his Vets category.

He now lives in Nelson, New Zealand, with his family and is currently president of the Nelson Mountain Bike Club and a trustee on the Saxton Velodrome Trust and Nelson Tasman Cycle Trail Trust.

References 

1970 births
Living people
British male cyclists
Cyclists at the 1992 Summer Olympics
Cyclists at the 1994 Commonwealth Games
Commonwealth Games silver medallists for England
Olympic cyclists of Great Britain
Sportspeople from Redditch
Commonwealth Games medallists in cycling
20th-century British people
Medallists at the 1994 Commonwealth Games